Margaret Taylor may refer to:

Margaret Taylor (1788–1852), wife of Zachary Taylor and First Lady of the United States from 1849 to 1850
Margaret Young Taylor (1837–1919), American leader in The Church of Jesus Christ of Latter-day Saints
Margaret L. Curry (born Taylor, 1898–1986), American state parole officer and medical social worker
Peggy Taylor (1912–2002), American singer and television announcer
Peg Taylor (cricketer) (1917–2004), New Zealand cricketer
Peggy Taylor (spy) (1920–2006), French World War II spy
Peggy Taylor (EastEnders), a character from EastEnders

See also
Margaret Taylor-Burroughs, American artist and writer